Paresh Shivalkar (born 1981) is an Indian football player. He is currently playing for Mumbai F.C as a central midfielder and left winger.

Career
He started by playing for Sky Hawks in the local league. He was selected for the under-19 and -21 national trials by Maharashtra, however, couldn't make it to the final squad. He moved to Mumbai, and signed for a second division team, Gulf Oil. While playing for Gulf Oil in the Mumbai Football League, he got noticed by Air India FC coach, Bimal Ghosh. He was pretty impressed at Paresh's skills, and eventually signed him for Air India FC for the next two seasons.

In the 2005 season, he joined Churchill Brothers S.C. The next season, he returned to Air India FC.
He has also 
Represented Pune University 
Represented Maharashtra U-19
Represented Maharashtra U-21
Represented Maharashtra for National Games 
Represented Maharashtra for Santosh Trophy 9 times
Captained Maharashtra team 3 times
Represented Indian Senior National Team
Club Represented-
Air India 2002,03,05,06
Churchill Brothers 2004
Mahindra United 2007 - 2010
Pune FC 2010 - 2012
Mumbai Tigers 2012 - 2014 
Mumbai FC - 2014- 2016

Coaching Details-
AIFF D license 
AFC C license 
AFC B license 
FIFA Youth Coaching course

Chief scout of reliance foundation young champs for Maharashtra region

Selector of senior Maharashtra Santosh trophy 2020

Selector of khelo India youth games 2019

Assistant Coach of Maharashtra for Santosh Trophy 2019

Head coach of Maharashtra for Khelo India Youth Games 2020

References

External links
 Profile at Goal.com
 

Indian footballers
1981 births
Living people
Footballers from Mumbai
Air India FC players
Churchill Brothers FC Goa players
Mahindra United FC players
Pune FC players
I-League players
Mumbai Tigers FC players
Association football wingers